Harvey Barnes Cushman (July 5, 1877 – December 27, 1920) was an American professional baseball pitcher with the Pittsburgh Pirates of Major League Baseball, with whom he played for in 1902. He was born in Rockland, Maine, and played college baseball at Maine for one season (1897).

References

External links

1877 births
1920 deaths
Major League Baseball pitchers
Pittsburgh Pirates players
Des Moines Undertakers players
Des Moines Prohibitionists players
Baseball players from Maine
People from Rockland, Maine
Maine Black Bears baseball players